Shaligowraram is a village in Nalgonda district of the Indian state of Telangana. It is located in Shaligowraram mandal of Nalgonda division. It is the headquarters of Shaligouraram mandal.

Government and politics
The major political parties are the Indian National Congress, Bharatiya Janata Party, Telangana Rashtra Samithi, and other [[Various Communist/Leftist Parties in India|left parties]

References

Villages in Nalgonda district
Mandal headquarters in Nalgonda district